Goldsberry may refer to:

Goldsberry (surname)
Goldsberry, Missouri, an unincorporated community in Macon County, Missouri, United States
Goldsberry Township, Howell County, Missouri, an inactive township in Howell County, Missouri, United States

See also
Goldsberry Track, a sports venue in Athens, Ohio
Goldberry, a character in The Lord of the Rings